This is a list of countries by population in 1500. Estimate numbers are from the beginning of the year, and exact population figures are for countries that held a census on various dates in that year. The bulk of these numbers are sourced from Alexander V. Avakov's Two Thousand Years of Economic Statistics, Volume 1, pages 12 to 14, which cover population figures from the year 1500 divided into modern borders. Avakov, in turn, cites a variety of sources, mostly Angus Maddison.

See also
List of countries by population
List of sovereign states in 1500
List of countries by population in 1600
List of countries by population in 1700

Notes

References

Sources

Kurt Witthauer. Bevölkerung der Erde (1958)
Calendario Atlante de Agostini, anno 99 (2003)
The Columbia Gazetteer of the World (1998)
Britannica Book of the Year: World Data (1997)

1500
1500